The Expendables are an American reggae rock band from Santa Cruz, California.

History

Formation and sound style (1997–2000)
The Expendables was formed in 1997 by elementary school buddies Geoff Weers on vocals and guitar, Raul Bianchi on lead guitar and Adam Patterson on drums. The trio started out as a "party band" while they were in high school. They covered a lot of surf rock songs such as "Wipeout" and Dick Dale's "Miserloo" for friends birthdays and family gatherings. Then in 2000, the band added Ryan DeMars on bass and the quartet completed their "laid-back" surf sound born on their hometown beaches of Santa Cruz, California.

Their music is a diverse mix of styles, including reggae, ska, surf rock, punk, and metal.

No Time To Worry and Open Container (2001–2003)
The Expendables added another guitarist, Cam Hanson to the lineup for their upcoming debut album. The band recorded their first studio album titled, No Time To Worry, on January 2, 2001, at the local Paradise Recordings. This whopping 18-song LP was released on Right Time Records. It was mastered by Rick "Rev. Lovejoy" Williams and featured rap vocals on the song "B.A.D." by Marcuz Rodriguez.

They quickly followed their debut album up with a second studio album with Open Container, which released on January 1, 2002, on Right Time Records. Again, it was self-produced by the band and featured 16 tracks. However, this was the last album for Cam Hanson on guitar and the band went back to being a quartet.

With their popularity growing around town, in 2003, they had their own radio show called, Locals Only, on radio station KMBY.

Gettin Filthy and Self-titled album (The best of the bunch) (2004–2007)

On September 28, 2004, the band released their third album titled, Gettin' Filthy which featured their first two hit singles, "Bowl For Two" and "Sacrifice" "Sacrifice" was also available as a playable song in the music video game Guitar Hero World Tour (also as Guitar Hero 4). For this album, the band utilized studio musician Steve Hoffman on keyboards and piano on four tracks. It was recorded and mixed at Sy Klopps Studios in San Francisco.

In 2005, The Expendables contributed to a compilation album that was a fundraising effort for the USA junior surfing team. The 2005 film XXX Rated: A Year in the Life of a Santa Cruz Phenomenon follows the band during some of their touring.

On September 4, 2007, the band recorded their fourth album, the self-titled, The Expendables, which was the first LP to be released on Slightly Stoopid's own label, Stoopid Records. The 16-song album featured the popular singles, "Down, Down, Down" and "Ganja Smugglin". In the studio they added keys, percussion and trumpet, along with Miles Doughty of Slightly Stoopid on vocals for some songs.

Prove It and Gone Soft Acoustic album (2010–2012)

Their fifth studio album, Prove It, released on May 11, 2010, on Stoopid Records. It certainly proved to be their most musically influenced album yet. With the addition of keyboards, trumpet, saxophone, percussion, vibraphone, rainstick, and extra dub effects, as well as vocals and harmonica by G. Love. The album was mixed and produced by Aaron "El Hefe" Abeyta and Paul Leary (Sublime) at Big Fish Recordings in Encinitas, California.

On April 21, 2012, The Expendables released a new single, "Back Home Again" for Record Store Day, recorded during their acoustic sessions. On May 17, 2012, the band released their first acoustic album, titled Gone Soft, which included acoustic versions of their previous songs. They added musicians who played banjo, cello, mandolin, percussion and violin to their tracks. It was recorded at Coral Street Studios and mixed by Paul Leary at Preacher Mon Studios.

Raul Bianchi explained in an interview with Monday Magazine about the possibilities of a split album with themselves: "One of the things we've thought about doing is a split with ourselves, where we do two EPs in one: one all metal and one all reggae. And one of the ideas we approached was doing newer versions of some songs. Like maybe doing heavier versions of some of our reggae songs and doing reggae versions of some more rock or metal songs. We don't really have time for it right now, but it's something that we're definitely considering."

Sand In The Sky (2013–2015)
In early 2013, they also began playing another new song live, titled "Black Heart". This track would be a precursor to their upcoming album.

On January 13, 2015, the band's sixth studio album Sand in the Sky released on Stoopid Records. The 12-song LP featured two singles, "Starry Night" and "Music Move Me". It included Geoff Weers not only on guitar but keyboard as well, among other musicians on trumpet, percussion, saxophone and trombone.

Moment EP and Gone Raw (2017–Present)
On May 5, 2017, the band released their first EP, Moment, on Ineffable Records, who the band currently signed with. The album shows the band moving in different musical directions by collaborating with popular reggae artists like Eric Rachmany of Rebelution and Micah Pueschel of Iration. It includes the hit single "I Won't Give Up", featuring HIRIE. The album debuted at #1 on the Billboard Top Reggae Albums chart. The EP was mixed by top reggae producer Danny Kalb.

The Expendables released their second acoustic album, Gone Raw on December 6, 2019.

They also released their first live album titled, Live From Hollywood on September 18, 2020. The session was recorded live at The Roxy on November 17, 2017, that the band wanted to put out new material during the COVID-19 pandemic.

The Expendables also recorded a single, "You're Right Here", which released on December 11, 2020. The music video which featured the band live in the studio with cameos of popular American reggae band members singing along. The video was dedicated to "all the fans, bands, and crew members, and everyone in the industry affected by the 2020 COVID shutdown who work tirelessly to make live music possible."

Tours
The Expendables average 125–150 shows a year, including international countries like Germany and Guam. They have toured with such acts as 311, Pepper, Slightly Stoopid, Kottonmouth Kings, Less Than Jake, G. Love & Special Sauce, and Reel Big Fish. The band is signed to the record label Stoopid Records, which is owned by Slightly Stoopid.

They have funded their own headlining tours across the country as well. They also headlined the Ladera Skateboards Winter Blackout 2012 Tour along with Fortunate Youth, MTHDS & The Roots.

In 2021, The Expendables got back to touring in the summer with their first tour since the COVID-19 pandemic on the wast coast. Next, starting on September 26, they will be co-headling a Fall tour with Ballyhoo!, presenting what they call "The ExpendaHoo! 2021 Tour", which includes opening band, Tunnel Vision. The band collabored with Ballyhoo! on their 2011 single "Walk Away", creating a remixed version with both Howie Spangler and Geoff Weers on vocals. Then Ballyhoo! covered The Expendables 2007 single, "Down Down Down".

Other projects
The Expendables have expanded their brand into cannabis when they started a boutique company called ExpendaFarms. They developed their own marijuana strain, "ExpendaBerry", which is as their song "Bowl For Two" describes it with "frosty purple nugs". The product line includes CBD sublingual tinctures with all the flower farming grown organically and without the use of pesticides.

Lineup

Current members

Geoff Weers – Lead Vocals, Guitar (1997–present)
Raul Bianchi – Lead Guitar (1997–present)
Adam Patterson – Drums, Vocals (1997–present)
Ryan DeMars – Bass (2000–present)

Past members
Cam Hanson – Guitar (2001–2003)(featured on No Time To Worry & Open Container albums)

Discography

Studio albums

Live/Acoustic albums

Singles

References

External links
 The Expendables official website

American reggae musical groups
American ska punk musical groups
Reggae rock groups